Jan-Lucas Dorow (born 26 April 1993) is a German footballer who plays as a striker for Rot-Weiß Oberhausen in the Regionalliga West.

Club career
Dorow joined 1. FC Kaiserslautern in 2008 from SV Kohlbachtal. He made his 2. Bundesliga debut at 13 December 2013 against SC Paderborn 07 replacing Enis Alushi after 87 minutes in a 0–1 home loss.

References

External links

Jan-Lucas Dorow at Kicker

1993 births
Living people
Association football forwards
German footballers
1. FC Kaiserslautern II players
1. FC Kaiserslautern players
1. FSV Mainz 05 II players
Wormatia Worms players
Rot-Weiss Essen players
Rot-Weiß Oberhausen players
2. Bundesliga players
3. Liga players
Regionalliga players
People from Zweibrücken
Footballers from Rhineland-Palatinate